Nawab Fazl Ali Khan III Bahadur (11 December 1749 – 7 April 1769) was Nawab of Banganapalle between 1758 and 1769. But his possessions was confirmed only in 1765.

Birth
Nawab Fazl Ali Khan III Bahadur was born in 1749 at Banganapalle. He was the only son of Fazl Ali II Khan Bahadur and Khair un-nisa Begum Sahiba His birthname was Ghazanfar Ali Mirza.

Royal name
His official name was Qum Qam ud-Daula, Nawab Fazl Ali Khan III Bahadur, Shamsher Jang [Gulli Nawab], Jagirdar of Banganapalle and Chenchelimala.

Life
He succeeded on the death of his paternal grandfather, Nawab Faiz Ali Khan Bahadur in 1758. He reigned under the guardianship of the husband of his maternal aunt, Muhammad Beg Khan-i-Lang between 1758 and 1767. He got confirmed in his possessions by the Nizam of Hyderabad on 17 January 1765.  He entered the Nizam's service and appointed to a mansab of 500 zat and was  promoted to 3,000 zat and 2,000 sowar and granted the title of Khan Bahadur 11 February 1765. Later he expelled his guardian and assumed full ruling powers in 1767. Later he was again promoted to the titles of Qum Qam ud-Daula and Shamsher Jang.

Death
He died of smallpox on 7 April 1769 and was succeeded by his nephew, Sayyid Husain Ali Khan Bahadur

See also
Nawab of Carnatic
Nawab of Masulipatam
Nawab of Banganapalle

References

1749 births
1769 deaths